Eunice Gibson (14 February 1895 – 5 December 1974)  was a Barbados nurse and the founder of the Barbados Nurses Association.

Early life
Eunice Gibson was born on 14 February 1895.

Activism
Gibson founded an organization for employing nurses in 1937 and was elected to the Bridgeton City Council in 1959.

Barbados Nurses Association
In July 1936, Gibson and 11 other nurses formed the Barbados Nurses Association (BNA) to improve working conditions at Barbados General Hospital. Gibson led the organisation until 1946. During her tenure, the BNA was made a municipal corporation by the Parliament of Barbados on 15 February 1943. She remained an active member of the organization for 37 years. Gibson campaigned the International Nurses Association in 1957 to accept the BNA as one of its members.

Death and legacy
Gibson died on 5 December 1974 and was interred at Bridgetown's Westbury Cemetery.

The Barbados Nurses Association annually hosts an awards ceremony named for Gibson, the Eunice Gibson Memorial Lecture and Awards Ceremony. A hospital, Eunice Gibson Polyclinic, was also named after Gibson.

Citations

1895 births
1974 deaths
Barbadian nurses
Women nurses